Stop Doing Bad Things is the third full-length release from American band, Spitalfield, released on March 22, 2005, through Victory.

Track listing
All songs by Spitalfield
 "So I Heard You Joined A Convent" – 3:01
 "Texa$ With A Dollar Sign" – 3:51
 "Gold Dust Vs. State Of Illinois" – 4:08
 "What Were You Thinking?" – 3:32
 "Tampa Bum Blues" – 2:48
 "Restraining Order Blues" – 4:03
 "The Future Is Now" – 3:21
 "Van Buren" – 2:46
 "From The Desk Of B. Larsen" – 3:54
 "Building A Better City By Design" – 2:58
 "Simple Minds, Simple Lives" – 3:29

Notes
Some prints of the album have 12 tracks, but tracks 3 and 4 are both "Gold Dust Vs. State Of Illinois."  This was a pressing error by Victory Records, but it was played off by a contest in which the first two hundred people to submit "the final bad thing" won a prize.
The song title "Texa$ With A Dollar Sign" is derived from a famous SNL "Celebrity Jeopardy" skit where Jimmy Fallon, as French Stewart, wagers "Texa$" in Final Jeopardy.

Personnel
Adapted from discogs

Spitalfield
Daniel Lowder - guitar
T.J. Minich - bass guitar
Mark Rose - vocals, guitar
J.D. Romero - drums

Production
Ed Rose - production
Michael Fossenkemper - mixing
Paul Friemel - album layout, album artwork, band photography
Craig Aichele - band photography

References

Spitalfield albums
2005 albums
Victory Records albums
Albums produced by Ed Rose